'Gbenga Sesan (born 27 July 1977) is a social entrepreneur who delivers Information and communications technology to the under served. He has had a career in the application of Information and Communication Technologies for Development (ICT4D) – for individuals, institutions, nation-states, regional entities and the international community.

Education 
Sesan (born Oluwagbenga Olabisi Sesan on July 27, 1977) is the Executive Director of Paradigm Initiative.
Graduated as an Electronic and Electrical Engineer at Obafemi Awolowo University in the year 2002. Sesan completed Executive Education programs at Lagos Business School, New York Group for Technology Transfer, Oxford University, Harvard University, Stanford University, Santa Clara University and University of the Pacific.

Career 
Sesan is a former member of the United Nations Committee of eLeaders on Youth and ICT.

He is a CyberStewards Fellow, Crans Montana Forum Fellow, Archbishop Desmond Tutu Leadership Fellow, Ashoka Fellow, Our Common Future and Cordes Fellow.

Sesan served as a member of the Presidential committees on Harmonization of Information Technology, Telecommunications and Broadcasting Sectors (2006), and Roadmap for the Achievement of Accelerated Universal Broadband Infrastructure and Services Provision (2013), 

In 2016, Gbenga revealed that at the end of 2017, he would hand over his role as CEO to someone else to pursue policy.

In 2022, United Nations Secretary-General António Guterres appointed Gbenga to serve on his inaugural Internet Governance Forum (IGF) Leadership Panel.

Publications 

Sesan has written five books and numerous published works.

“Wh@t’s Next? The Future of the Information Society - A Youth Perspective” was edited by Youth for Intergenerational Justice and Sustainability, and TakingITGlobal. Featuring young authors from every continent, the book describes what young people are doing with ICT, and attempts to describe the direction of the Information Society.

Sesan also contributed towards the United Nations Economic Commission for Africa's “Africa Networking: Development Information, ICTs and Governance”. He wrote the chapter titled, "African Youth in the Information Society".

In November 2005, Sesan completed editorial work on “Global Process, Local Reality: Nigerian Youth Lead Action in the Information Society”, which was presented at the World Summit on the Information Society in Tunis.

"ICTs for Development: The Challenges of Meeting the Millennium Development Goals in Africa" was published by Nigerian Communications Commission/Growing Businesses Foundation/Club of Rome in September 2006 and featured a chapter on "Telecentres in Nigeria" by Sesan.

He completed work on his first attempt at an autobiography, In My Own Words, in 2009 and it was published by London-based Imprimata Publishers.

Some of his published works include Digital Lifestyle of Connected Nigerians, Echoes From Ajegunle: Stories of Transformed Lives, From Small Steps to Giant Leap, ICTs for Development: A Social Entrepreneur’s Perspective, Ajegunle.org: Changing Ajegunle, 25 Youths at a time and Social Enterprise in Africa: An Emerging Concept in an Emerging Economy

Family 
Sesan lives in Lagos. He is married to Temilade.

Honours and awards 
2012 Listed by CNN as one of the 10 Leading African Tech Voices on Twitter
2012 Listed by Ventures Africa as one of 40 African Legends Under 40
2014 Schwab Foundation Social Entrepreneur of the Year 2014

References

External links 
 His website
 His Ashoka profile

1977 births
Nigerian businesspeople
Living people
Harvard University alumni
Stanford University alumni
Ashoka Fellows